Yu Ruihuang (March 10, 1906 – May 19, 1997) was a Chinese physicist, who was a member of the Chinese Academy of Sciences.

References 

1906 births
1997 deaths
Members of the Chinese Academy of Sciences